Swanport, also formerly known as Thompson's Crossing and Thomson's Landing, is a suburban satellite locality of Murray Bridge in South Australia on the west (right) bank of the Murray River adjacent to Swanport Bridge. Its boundaries were formalised in March 2000 to cover a portion of semi-urban land immediately south of the South Eastern Freeway adjacent to the Swanport Bridge, which is the main road freight route over the Murray. It is named for the docking place on the west bank of the Murray which was home to "numerous swans" and also known as Thomson's Landing.

See also
 List of cities and towns in South Australia

References 

Towns in South Australia